Valea Vinului may refer to the following places in Romania:

 Valea Vinului, a commune of Satu Mare County
 Valea Vinului, a village in the commune Rodna, Bistrița-Năsăud County 
 Valea Vinului, a tributary of the Cormaia in Bistrița-Năsăud County 
 Valea Vinului (Someș), a tributary of the Someș in Satu Mare County
 Valea Vinului, a tributary of the Taița in Tulcea County
 Valea Vinului (Vișeu), a tributary of the Vișeu in Maramureș County
 Valea Vinului, another name for the river Pârâul Vinului in Harghita County

See also
Valea (disambiguation)
Vinu (name)